Radislav Dragićević (Cyrillic: Радислав Драгићевић; born 13 September 1971) is a Montenegrin retired football midfielder and current manager of Arsenal Tivat.

Playing career
During the 1990s he played in FR Yugoslav top league clubs FK Budućnost Podgorica, FK Vojvodina, FK Borac Čačak and FK Bečej, before moving to Greece where he played with Anagennisi Karditsa F.C., Kallithea F.C. and Zakynthos F.C. with the exception of one season in Cyprus with APOP Kinyras FC. In 2012, he returned to Montenegro and signed with FK Budućnost Podgorica.

Managerial career
Dragićević worked as the assistant manager of Budućnost Podgorica from 2009 to June 2012, before he was appointed as the manager for the club on 25 June 2012. At the time, Dragićević was also a part of the staff of the Montenegrin national team, which he had been since September 2011. He left Budućnost Podgorica in July 2013.

References

External links
 Early career at ObilicTripod
 Radislav Dragićević at Footballdatabase

1971 births
Living people
Footballers from Podgorica
Association football midfielders
Serbia and Montenegro footballers
Montenegrin footballers
FK Budućnost Podgorica players
FK Vojvodina players
OFK Bečej 1918 players
FK Borac Čačak players
Anagennisi Karditsa F.C. players
Kallithea F.C. players
APOP Kinyras FC players
FK Kom players
First League of Serbia and Montenegro players
Football League (Greece) players
Cypriot First Division players
Serbia and Montenegro expatriate footballers
Expatriate footballers in Greece
Serbia and Montenegro expatriate sportspeople in Greece
Expatriate footballers in Cyprus
Serbia and Montenegro expatriate sportspeople in Cyprus
Montenegrin expatriate footballers
Montenegrin expatriate sportspeople in Greece
Montenegrin football managers
FK Budućnost Podgorica managers
FK Jedinstvo Bijelo Polje managers
FK Iskra Danilovgrad managers
FK Rudar Pljevlja managers
FK Kom managers